Anton Aleksandrovich Zemlyanukhin (born 11 December 1988) is a Kyrgyzstani international footballer who plays for Alga Bishkek.

Club career
He can play as striker, left winger, left midfielder or left-back.

Zemlyanukhin signed a five-year contract with TFF First League club Giresunspor at age 18 in August 2007, and he has gone out on loan to Abdish-Ata Kant and FC Taraz to seek more first team football.

Between 2010 and 2014 he played in the Kazakhstan Premier League with FC Taraz, FC Aktobe, FC Kairat and FC Kaisar.

On 13 February 2015, he signed a one-year contract with Serbian club FK Radnički Niš. His regular games in the Serbian championship and his goals at his return to the national team, made him receive the title of Kyrgyz player of the year for 2015.

On 5 November 2016, he officially transferred to Sukhothai after being released from Sisaket due to no offer for contract extension.

On 21 June 2017, Zemlyanukhin moved to the Russian Premier League, signing with a newly promoted club FC SKA-Khabarovsk. The contract was cancelled a short time later before he played any official games for the club due to him being injured at the time of the signing.

On 21 February 2018, FC Atyrau announced the signing of Zemlyanukhin.

On 5 December 2018, FC Dordoi Bishkek announced the signing of Zemlyanukhin alongside Pavel Matyash and Azamat Baymatov. On 16 January 2021, Dordoi Bishkek confirmed the departure of Zemlyanukhin after the expiation of his contract.

In March 2021, Zemlyanukhin signed for Alga Bishkek.

International career
As of 2018, Zemlyanukhin has made 30 appearances for the Kyrgyzstan national team, including participation in the 2009 Nehru Cup.

He has debuted in 2007, and after a pause he made in the national team, by joining Serbian side Radnički Niš, he returned to the national team and was part of the squad named for the friendly match against Afghanistan played on 26 March 2015.

In March 2015 he scored his first ever brace for the national team, in the opening 2018 World Cup qualification match against Bangladesh, in which his team subsequently won 3–1.

Career statistics

International
Statistics accurate as of match played 21 January 2019

International goals
Scores and results list Kyrgyzstan's goal tally first.

Honours

Club
Abdish-Ata Kant
Kyrgyzstan Cup: 2007, 2009, 2011

Aktobe
Kazakhstan Premier League: 2013

Dordoi Bishkek
Kyrgyz Premier League: 2019
Kyrgyzstan Super Cup: 2019

Individual
Kyrgyz player of the year: 2015

References

External links

1988 births
Living people
People from Chüy Region
Kyrgyzstani people of Russian descent
Kyrgyzstani footballers
Kyrgyzstan international footballers
Kyrgyzstani expatriate footballers
FC Abdysh-Ata Kant players
Giresunspor footballers
Expatriate footballers in Turkey
FC Taraz players
FC Aktobe players
FC Kairat players
FC Kaisar players
Kazakhstan Premier League players
Expatriate footballers in Kazakhstan
FK Radnički Niš players
Serbian SuperLiga players
Expatriate footballers in Serbia
Anton Zemlyanukhin
Anton Zemlyanukhin
Anton Zemlyanukhin
Expatriate footballers in Thailand
Association football forwards
2019 AFC Asian Cup players
FC SKA-Khabarovsk players
Kyrgyzstani expatriate sportspeople in Turkey
Kyrgyzstani expatriate sportspeople in Kazakhstan
Kyrgyzstani expatriate sportspeople in Serbia